The coat of arms of the state of New York was formally adopted in 1778, and appears as a component of the state's flag and seal.

The shield displays a masted ship and a sloop on the Hudson River (symbols of inland and foreign commerce), bordered by a grassy shore and a mountain range in the background with the smiling sun rising behind it. The unheraldic nature of the Hudson River landscape reveals the modern origin of the design.

The shield has two supporters:

 Left: Liberty, with the Revolutionary imagery of a Phrygian cap raised on a pole. Her left foot treads upon a crown that represents freedom from the British monarchy that once ruled what is now New York as a colony.
 Right: Justice, wearing a blindfold (representing impartiality) and holding scales (representing fairness) and the sword of justice.

A banner below the shield shows the motto Excelsior, a Latin word meaning "higher", "superior", "lordly", commonly translated as "Ever Upward." Following the adoption of the 2021 State Budget in April 2020, a secondary motto, E pluribus unum, appears.

Flags bearing the pre-2020 coat of arms (i.e. without the motto E pluribus unum) are still widely used so long as serviceable.

The shield is surmounted by a crest consisting of an eagle surmounting a world globe.

The flag of New York is the coat of arms on a solid blue background and the state seal of New York is the coat of arms surrounded by the words "The Great Seal of the State of New York." It is one of eight U.S. state flags to feature an eagle, alongside those of Illinois, Iowa, Michigan, North Dakota, Oregon, Pennsylvania and Utah.

Blazon
The official blazon for the coat of arms is:

Charge. Azure, in a landscape, the sun in fess, rising in splendor or, behind a range of three mountains, the middle one the highest; in base a ship and sloop under sail, passing and about to meet on a river, bordered below by a grassy shore fringed with shrubs, all proper.

Crest. On a wreath azure and or, an American eagle proper, rising to the Dexter from a two-thirds of a globe terrestrial, showing the north Atlantic ocean with outlines of its shores.

Supporters. On a quasi compartment formed by the extension of the scroll.Dexter. The figure of Liberty proper, her hair disheveled and decorated with pearls, vested azure, sandaled gules, about the waist a cincture or, fringed gules, a mantle of the last depending from the shoulders behind to the feet, in the dexter hand a staff ensigned with a Phrygian cap or, the sinister arm embowed, the hand supporting the shield at the dexter chief point, a royal crown by her sinister foot dejected.Sinister. The figure of Justice proper, her hair disheveled and decorated with pearls, vested or, about the waist a cincture azure, fringed gules, sandaled and mantled as Liberty, bound about the eyes with a fillet proper, in the dexter hand a straight sword hilted or, erect, resting on the sinister chief point of the shield, the sinister arm embowed, holding before her scales proper.Motto. On a scroll below the shield argent, in sable, two lines. On line one, Excelsior and on line two, E pluribus unum.''

Interpretation
According to Joseph Gavit in New York History, Volume XXXI, the seal symbolizes the following:

 In the center, a shield reveals the sun rising behind Mount Beacon over the Hudson River. "The shield symbolizes in the full sun the name and idea of Old York and the old world; the mountains, river and meadow, with the ships, convey the name and idea of New York in the new world."
 To the right, Justice is ready to fight tyranny with her sword held high.
 Liberty, on the left, holds her foot on the overthrown English crown. "This New York is supported by Justice and Liberty, and discards monarchy."
 The world globe is displayed above the shield. "By exhibiting the eastern and western continents on the globe, the old and new are brought together;"
 Above the world globe soars the eagle. "while the eagle on the crest proclaims," Westward the course of empire takes its way."
 The bottom ribbon exclaims "Excelsior," which means "still higher" or "ever upward."

History

The first version of the coat of arms on the state flag was adopted in 1778 and has been slightly redesigned over the years. The present flag itself is a contemporary variant of an American Revolutionary War-era flag. The original is at the Albany Institute of History & Art. 

The flag was formally adopted in 1896; the legislature changed the field of the flag from buff to blue by a law enacted on April 2, 1901.

In 2001, the North American Vexillological Association (NAVA) surveyed its members on the designs of the 72 U.S. state, U.S. territorial, and Canadian provincial flags. After the survey was completed, NAVA members chose the flag of New York to be ranked 53rd out of the 72.

In April 2020, the 2021 state budget was passed, modifying the coat of arms to include "E Pluribus Unum" as a secondary motto beneath "Excelsior". The state seal and flag were also updated as well to reflect the change.

See also

 State of New York
 Symbols of the state of New York
 Flags of governors of the U.S. states
 Flags of New York City

References

External links

 New York State Flag 
 The Great Seal of the State of New York
 STATE SEAL

New York
Symbols of New York (state)
New York
New York
New York
New York
New York
New York
New York
New York
New York